The 2008 National Club Baseball Association (NCBA) Division II World Series was played at League Stadium in Huntingburg, IN from May 16 to May 20. This was the first time that the NCBA had offered a Division II World Series for club baseball teams.

The University of Kentucky won the inaugural NCBA Division II World Series over the University of Illinois in walk-off fashion.

Format
The format is similar to the NCAA College World Series in that eight teams participate in two four-team double elimination brackets with the only difference being that in the NCBA, there is only one game that decides the national championship rather than a best-of-3 like the NCAA.  Another difference which is between NCBA Division I and II is that Division II games are 7 innings while Division I games are 9 innings.

Participants
LSC-Kingwood
North Greenville
Wyoming
NYU
Illinois†
VCU
Kentucky
Southern Illinois
† - denotes team also fields an NCBA Division I team

Results

Bracket

Game Results

Championship Game

Notes
Kentucky's victory over Illinois in the title game set two NCBA Division II World Series records which still stand.  Most runs scored by one team in a non-extra inning title game (7, Kentucky) and most combined runs in a non-extra inning title game (13).

See also
2008 NCBA Division I World Series

References

Baseball competitions in Indiana
2008 in baseball
National Club Baseball Association
2008 in sports in Indiana
Huntingburg, Indiana
College sports tournaments in Indiana